The Bauris (Bengali:বাউরী) are recognised as an indigenous Bhil Subgroup of Bengali Hindu community, belonging to the Kashyapa clan and Shakta sect of Hinduism, primarily residing in Bengal found in large numbers in Bankura, Birbhum, Purulia and other districts in Indian states of West Bengal, Assam, Tripura, and Orissa. The village of Purbo Tila in Chatlapur Tea Garden, Kulaura and Dakchara Tea Garden, Srimangal, Moulvibazar District are also home to Bauri communities in Bangladesh. They are also found in many villages like Chhatna and Beliatore.

Bauris numbered 1,091,022 in the 2001 census  in the state of West Bengal. 37.5 per cent of the Bauris were literate - 51.8 per cent males and 22.7 per cent females were literate. Only 4.7 per cent of the Bauris were matriculates or completed schooling.

The Bauris are usually involved in activities like farming. The Bauris of Purbo Tila Moulvibazar in Bangladesh are usually involved in medicinal practices . The prime festivals they celebrate are known as Mansa Puja, Durga puja and kali puja. Still today they lack many facilities provided by the Government as those facilities could not reach them easily as they live in very remote villages. The State Government has also started an initiative to provide them houses made of bricks and cements and the Local Government has been quiet successful in this initiative. Also the Government is trying to provide construction of free toilets. Also Government has set up many Primary and Secondary schools so they can be encouraged to get the best education to improve themselves and the Government has also started the Mid-Day Meal Scheme for them.

Subcastes
Bauris are divided into the following subcastes: Mallabhumia, Sikharia or Gobaria, Panchakoti, Mola or Mulo, Dhalia or Dhulo, Malua, Jhatia or Jhetia, and Pathuria. Some of these subcastes appear to be territorial subdivisions. Mallabhumia, Malua and perhaps also Mola, were residents of Mallabhum, the central and eastern parts of Bankura district. Sikharia were Bauris who hailed from Shikharbhum, the tract between the Kasai and Barakar rivers. The Dhulia subcaste is supposed to be from Dhalbhum, which is the area in Khatra subdivision. Panchakoti refers to the central area of Panchet estate now in Purulia district.

Practices
Traces of totemism still survive in their reverence for the red-backed heron. The heron is looked upon as the emblem of the community.

Prominent Bauris
Sandhya Bauri and her daughter, Susmita Bauri, have been members of parliament from Bishnupur (Lok Sabha constituency). Amar Kumar Bauri is a minister in jharkhand. Dasia Bauri was a saint in Orissa.

References

Bengali Hindu castes
Scheduled Tribes of India
Social groups of West Bengal
People from Kulaura Upazila